Aberdeen Ferryhill TMD was a railway traction maintenance depot in Aberdeen, Scotland. The depot code originally assigned by British Railways was 61B, but it was given the code AB latterly. Ferryhill Depot closed on 6th December 1987. The adjacent turntable and associated former engine shed form part of the Ferryhill Railway Heritage Centre.

History
In 1987 the depot had an allocation of Class 08 shunters. The depot also had two snowploughs. Other locomotives usually stabled at the depot included Classes 26, 27, 37 and 47.

References

Sources

Railway depots in Scotland